Mount Calvario is a peak belonging to the Apennine Mountain chain.

It is 777 m above sea level and on its southern slopes rises the municipality of Colobraro.

At the top of the mountain there is a cross, the destination of a traditional procession which, starting from Colobrario, is held on the penultimate Saturday of May.

Mountains of Basilicata